The Village Squire is a 1935 British comedy film directed by Reginald Denham and starring David Horne, Leslie Perrins, Moira Lynd and Vivien Leigh. It is based on Arthur Jarvis Black's play. The screenplay concerns a village's amateur production of MacBeth that is aided by the arrival of a Hollywood star. This provokes the fierce resistance of the village squire who hates films. The film was a quota quickie, produced at Elstree Studios for Paramount to help them meet their yearly quota set down by the British government.

Cast
 David Horne - Squire Hollis
 Leslie Perrins - Richard Venables
 Moira Lynd - Mary Hollis
 Vivien Leigh - Rose Venables
 Margaret Watson - Aunt Caroline
 Haddon Mason - Doctor Blake
 Ivor Barnard - Mr Worsford

References

Bibliography
 Chibnall, Steve. Quota Quickies: The Birth of the British 'B' film. British Film Institute, 2007.

External links

1935 films
1935 comedy films
Films directed by Reginald Denham
British films based on plays
Films set in England
British comedy films
Films produced by Anthony Havelock-Allan
Quota quickies
British black-and-white films
British and Dominions Studios films
Films shot at Imperial Studios, Elstree
1930s English-language films
1930s British films